Stenocercus squarrosus is a lizard found in Brazil.

References

squarrosus
Reptiles described in 2006